During the 94th Academy Awards on March 27, 2022, actor Will Smith walked onstage and slapped comedian Chris Rock across the face during Rock's presentation for Best Documentary Feature. The slap was in response to Rock's joke about Smith's wife Jada Pinkett Smith's shaved head, which she had been shaving since 2021 due to alopecia areata. Smith returned to his seat and shouted profanity at Rock, who briefly responded, but completed his presentation without further interruption.

Later that evening, Smith won Best Actor and apologized to the Academy of Motion Picture Arts and Sciences and other nominees, but not to Rock, in his acceptance speech. The next day, he issued an apology to Rock and the Academy through social media. Smith resigned his Academy membership on April 1, facing a potential suspension or expulsion, and was banned from attending Academy events for 10 years, effective April 8.

Live television broadcasts in the United States mostly muted the incident due to federal censorship laws. However, uncensored international footage went viral on social media; an excerpt from the Australian broadcast became one of the most-viewed online videos in the first 24 hours. The incident received worldwide attention and largely overshadowed the rest of the ceremony.

Background 
After the ceremony, some publications recalled Rock's past remarks about Jada Pinkett Smith. In 1997, he had commented on her participation in the Million Woman March in an interview on his late night-talk show, The Chris Rock Show, where Pinkett Smith appeared visibly upset by his jokes on black feminism.

Rock had previously hosted the awards twice, including in 2016, which several actors (including Pinkett Smith) boycotted due to the lack of African-American nominees. Rock joked in his opening monologue: "Jada boycotting the Oscars is like me boycotting Rihanna's panties. I wasn't invited."

In 2018, on her talk show Red Table Talk, Pinkett Smith revealed she had been experiencing hair loss, potentially because of stress. She was diagnosed with alopecia areata and in July 2021, she started completely shaving her head.

On February 8, 2022, it was announced that Will Smith had been nominated for an Academy Award for his acting in the film King Richard. On March 3, 2022, the Academy of Motion Picture Arts and Sciences announced Rock as one of the presenters of the 94th Academy Awards.

Incident 
Rock announced the nominees for Best Documentary Feature at the 94th Academy Awards, where he performed a brief monologue largely read from a teleprompter script. Rock joked about husband and wife Javier Bardem and Penélope Cruz, both previous Oscar winners receiving comparable nominations at that ceremony. Smith and Pinkett Smith were seated together near the front of the audience. Rock then made a comment about Pinkett Smith's shaved head, making a comparison to Demi Moore's dramatic look in the 1997 film G.I. Jane.

Much of the audience and Smith laughed, while Pinkett Smith rolled her eyes in annoyance. Rock prepared to continue his speech.

As Rock continued to laugh, Smith silently strode across the stage, slapped Rock in the face, then turned around and walked back to his seat. The attack, which some assumed was prearranged comedy, startled the audience. Many noted that this act contradicted and jeopardized the calm, positive public image that Smith had built in his three-decade career. The previously calm Rock also looked startled, while Smith shouted at him from his seat.

This exchange caused the local audience and journalists to realize that Smith's anger was genuine. Kevin Costner, who waited offstage to present the Academy Award for Best Director, said, "Oh, that was real." Until Smith's acceptance speech, the reportedly stunned and confused audience expected any official acknowledgement from the stage, and those in the mezzanine level occasionally stood to peer over the balcony to seek action below. However, the show did not use hosts from this point and continued as normal. Smith's expletives were censored by audio muting during the live broadcast in many countries.

Photograph 
Photo-journalist Brian Snyder, working for Reuters in the photographer pool in the projection booth, photographed Smith striking Rock. This photo quickly went viral, was featured in news stories, and was adapted into Internet memes. He was unaware of the photo's cultural impact until after the ceremony, as his photos were automatically sent to his editors. He was profiled by multiple media outlets, including photography outlet PetaPixel. Another described him as "The One Winner In The Will Smith vs. Chris Rock 'Smackdown'", speculating that "Surely, Snyder will now win the most coveted and prestigious photojournalism award, the World Press Photo of the Year, thanks to his photo that captured the moment Smith hit Rock, as his photo has been used by every publication under the sun and has even become a meme." In Berlin, it was integrated into a mural on a remaining section of the Berlin Wall in Mauerpark.

Uncensored viewership 

In the United States, broadcaster ABC muted Rock's and Smith's expletives due to federal censorship laws; however, many international broadcasters did not, and uncensored recordings of the event went viral on social media. The uncensored excerpt from the Australian broadcast on the Seven Network was posted by The Guardian on YouTube, which received over 50 million views within 24 hours, becoming one of the most-viewed online videos in the first 24 hours. It reached number one on YouTube's trending page within three hours in many countries, including the United States, United Kingdom, Canada, Australia and New Zealand. Some media outlets referred to the altercation, in reference to the shot heard round the world, as "the slap heard around the world". Many Internet memes and parodies have been created from the photo and video.

Additional videos 
On March 31, additional smartphone footage was published from an audience member's perspective of the Smiths' table. This seems to show the reaction of Pinkett Smith during and after the joke, as unamused and rolling her eyes during the joke but then seeming to laugh when Rock commented, "Will Smith just smacked the shit out of me." and "That was a ... greatest night in the history of television."

Aftermath 
In a statement on March 30, the Academy said Smith had been asked to leave the ceremony but refused. However, others who were present in the room denied that Smith was ever asked, either directly or through a representative, to leave; disagreement ensued between members of the academy's leadership and ceremony producer Will Packer on whether Smith should be allowed to stay, which led to no action being taken. Variety reported that Packer "was the key to Smith remaining in his seat". In a subsequent interview with Good Morning America, Packer said he opposed suggestions to remove Smith from the theater because he did not believe that Rock would want it.

Within forty minutes, Smith was presented the award for Best Actor for his portrayal of Richard Williams in King Richard. He focused his emotional speech on divine justification and his need to protect those around him, and apologized to the Academy, the other nominees, and to Williams's daughters Venus and Serena, who were in attendance, despite not outwardly apologizing to Rock. Smith received a standing ovation.

After the ceremony, award winners were advised to only answer questions about their work and nothing else. LAPD officers met with Packer, who later recalled that they were prepared to arrest Smith on charges of battery. Rock repeatedly declined to press charges. On May 4, 2022, Dave Chappelle was performing stand-up comedy, where he was tackled onstage by an armed audience member. Chris Rock joined him onstage to joke, "Was that Will Smith?"

On November 29, 2022, Smith appeared as a guest on The Daily Show with Trevor Noah for his first public interview since the incident. After discussing Smith's upcoming film role in Emancipation, Trevor Noah questioned Smith about his reflections since the incident. Smith responded saying "That was a horrific night, as you could imagine. There's many nuances and complexities to it, but at the end of the day, I just lost it. I guess what I would say is you just never know what someone's going through."

During the next Academy Awards, host Jimmy Kimmel made a joke in his opening monologue stating that if any unexpected act of violence were to happen, that the attacker would be "allowed to stay at the ceremony", "win Best Actor", and "spend the night partying while listening to "Gettin' Jiggy wit It" at the afterparty". Later after the ceremony ended, a board parodying workplace "days without incident" signs would display a counter of one. In his Netflix special Selective Outrage, Rock made numerous jokes about the incident and Smith.

Public apologies 
Following public backlash, Smith issued a formal apology on Instagram and Facebook. He referred to his behavior as "unacceptable" and "inexcusable", directly addressing Rock: "I would like to publicly apologize to you, Chris. I was out of line and I was wrong. I am embarrassed and my actions were not indicative of the man I want to be. There is no place for violence in a world of love and kindness." Three days after the incident, Rock briefly mentioned the subject for the first time at a comedy show, saying that he was still processing it, but promised to talk about it in the future. He said that Smith had not contacted him personally, nor had they spoken since the ceremony. Claims on social media that Rock had apologized were debunked by fact checkers.

On July 29, 2022, Smith posted a YouTube video in which he addressed the incident and apologized to Rock, Rock's mother, Rock's brother Tony, Questlove, the other Oscar winners, and his wife Jada saying he was "deeply remorseful" for his actions.

Formal Academy review 
On March 28, the day after the incident, AMPAS announced a formal review. The Academy's Board of Governors intended to explore further action and consequences in accordance with its Bylaws, its Standards of Conduct, and with California law, scheduled for March 30. AMPAS President David Rubin and CEO Dawn Hudson issued a subsequent letter to Academy members, noting that the official process would take a few weeks. On March 29, Smith initiated a six-minute Zoom call with Rubin and Hudson, apologizing again for his actions. The Board of Governors were not aware of the conversation when discussing disciplinary procedures the following day. One of the participants in the board meeting stated the lack of transparency was suspicious and showed lack of leadership.

On March 30, the Academy initiated disciplinary proceedings against Smith for "violations of the Academy's Standards of Conduct, including inappropriate physical contact, abusive or threatening behavior, and compromising the integrity of the Academy". The academy said, "While we would like to clarify that Mr. Smith was asked to leave the ceremony and refused, we also recognize we could have handled the situation differently." Smith was invited to provide a written response within a fifteen day period, after which the Board of Governors would vote on whether "suspension, expulsion or other sanctions under the Academy's Standards of Conduct" would be applied. Numerous Academy members said that AMPAS should, at the very least, suspend his membership, citing the organization's Standards of Conduct implemented eight weeks after Harvey Weinstein's sexual misdeeds were exposed. The Academy had never expelled a member prior to 2004, when its 42-member board of governors voted unanimously to expel actor Carmine Caridi for sharing promotional copies of films that were later mass-distributed. Subsequently, the Academy expelled Harvey Weinstein, Roman Polanski, Bill Cosby, and cinematographer Adam Kimmel for sexual crimes.

Resignation and ban 
On April 1, Smith preemptively resigned the membership he had since 2001, because AMPAS had told him that he was likely to be expelled for a decade or more. AMPAS announced it would continue disciplinary proceedings for violations of the Academy's Standards of Conduct, in advance of its next scheduled board meeting on April 18. The AMPAS disciplinary meeting, originally scheduled for April 18, was reportedly intended to decide upon the issues unaddressed by Smith's resignation, including allowing him to retain his Best Actor Oscar for King Richard, allowing him to be invited by other members to future Academy Awards ceremonies, and allowing his nomination for future consideration while no longer a voting member of the Academy. Variety further reported that Smith's other professional memberships, such as at SAG-AFTRA, would be informed of the AMPAS disciplinary review outcome for further evaluation.

In a letter to the Board of Governors that was obtained by Variety, Rubin wrote that the earlier date was prompted by Smith's resignation from the Academy, stating that "Following Mr. Smith's resignation of his Academy membership on Friday, April 1, suspension or expulsion are no longer a possibility and the legally prescribed timetable no longer applies. It is in the best interest of all involved for this to be handled in a timely fashion."

In the meeting on April 8, Smith was banned from attending the Oscars or any other Academy event for 10 years. NBC News obtained a letter signed by David Rubin and Dawn Hudson, revealing the Board of Governors' decision effective that day, of a ten-year ban where Smith "shall not be permitted to attend any Academy events or programs, in person or virtually, including but not limited to the Academy Awards". Smith issued a succinct statement: "I accept and respect the Academy's decision."

Reactions 
An opinion poll from YouGov conducted the day after the ceremony found that 61% of Americans said that Smith's actions were unacceptable and 22% said they were acceptable. The Federal Communications Commission, which regulates U.S. broadcasting, received 66 complaints about the incident. Reactions from celebrities were divided.

SAG-AFTRA, the labor union representing film and television actors, issued a statement condemning Smith's behavior: "Violence or physical abuse in the workplace is never appropriate and the union condemns any such conduct. The incident involving Will Smith and Chris Rock at last night's Academy Awards was unacceptable. We have been in contact with the Academy of Motion Picture Arts and Sciences and ABC about this incident and will work to ensure this behavior is appropriately addressed. SAG-AFTRA does not comment on any pending member disciplinary process."

Crew of Summer of Soul 
Musician Questlove and film producers David Dinerstein, Robert Fyvolent, and Joseph Patel were on stage immediately after the incident to accept the Best Documentary Feature award for Summer of Soul, and some commenters opined that this award had been overshadowed by the incident. The distracted audience searched Twitter for information on Rock and Smith. Gabrielle Ulubay of Marie Claire wrote that Summer of Soul "deserved to have its moment, and Questlove's touching speech and tribute to his parents deserved to have our full attention—but instead, the world kept its mind on Will Smith and Chris Rock and its eyes on Twitter".

Questlove was asked about the incident by a reporter in a backstage press conference immediately after leaving the stage, and declined: "I'm not talking about that tonight, this is about the Harlem Cultural Festival." In an interview on The Tonight Show Starring Jimmy Fallon the next night, Questlove said he did not notice the slap in the moment because he was using Transcendental Meditation to curb his anxiety before the winner was called, and did not realize what had happened until "maybe three seconds before I spoke words".

Individuals 
Reactions from celebrity attendees at the Academy Awards varied. In general, there was strong condemnation of Smith's violence and support for Rock, though there were notable individuals who defended Smith's actions or refused to side solely with either man.

Responses from certain celebrities went viral online, with videos of comedic actor Jim Carrey criticizing Smith's behaviour amassing millions of views across social media and video platforms. In the clips taken from a CBS Mornings interview, Carrey stated, "You do not have the right to walk up on stage and smack somebody in the face because they said words", and that he would have sued Smith for  if he were in Rock's shoes, saying, "That video is going to be there forever. It's going to be ubiquitous. That insult is going to last a very long time." He further criticized the moral integrity of the Hollywood film industry for giving Smith a standing ovation after receiving his award.

Anthony Hopkins, who presented the Academy Award for Best Actress, directly addressed Smith's behaviour and Best Actor speech within his own speech, stating: "Will Smith said it all. What more can be said? Let's have peace and love and quiet." Hopkins' words received a mixed response from viewers, with the audience in attendance, and Smith himself, laughing in response to Hopkins' comments, while many online users argued over the potentially sarcastic undertone.

Comedians 
Comedians, including George Wallace and Kathy Griffin, spoke out about how the incident had worried them about potential future confrontations, and that they might be more careful about the topics of jokes going forward. Howie Mandel connected the Rock and Chappelle incidents, stating: "That [slap] opened the floodgates. You saw what happened at the Academy Awards, and I thought that [...] violence triggers violence, and I think this is the beginning of the end for comedy".

Comedic actor Cedric the Entertainer said at an Oscars after-party that if he was assaulted during a stand-up act for joking about someone's wife, he would defend himself. Comedian James Corden commended Rock for "keeping the show moving" and criticized Smith for not taking a joke; he spoofed the incident on The Late Late Show with James Corden by singing a parody of "We Don't Talk About Bruno" about Pinkett Smith. Amy Schumer claimed she was traumatized by the incident, and criticized Smith while referring to him as "Ali". She also criticized the control the AMPAS had over the ceremony, contrasting how she was restricted from joking about Halyna Hutchins's death in the Rust shooting incident against Smith's ability to "just come up and [slap] someone".

Comedian Gilbert Gottfried's final post on social media before his death on April 12 was supportive toward Rock, asking "Which is the worst crime? Chris Rock being physically assaulted or Chris Rock telling a joke?"

Late-night talk show hosts Stephen Colbert, Jimmy Kimmel, Jimmy Fallon, James Corden, Bill Maher, Andy Cohen, Seth Meyers, and Amber Ruffin all condemned Smith's actions in their monologues.

The Laugh Factory expressed its support of the First Amendment for comedians in the wake of the incident, and comedy clubs around the United States, including Stand Up NY and Carolines on Broadway, announced that they would be increasing security measures. The president of the Laugh Factory said he had noticed an increase of aggression among patrons since the businesses reopened after the COVID-19 pandemic shutdowns. The owner of the Comedy Cellar, however, expressed doubts that the attack would inspire copycats.

Politicians 
Politicians worldwide publicly discussed or took a position on the incident. Australian Prime Minister Scott Morrison, reflecting on his own marriage, said that he "can understand" the reason for Smith's actions, but "that's not how you roll". In Canada, Alberta premier Jason Kenney drew criticism for using a meme of the incident to express his position on green energy policies. The New Zealand National Party used a meme of the incident to criticize the New Zealand Labour Party on Facebook, but it was swiftly deleted and disavowed by leader Christopher Luxon. Rishi Sunak, British Chancellor of the Exchequer at the time, compared himself to Will Smith, having recently had his wife Akshata Murty criticized over owning shares in a tech company based in Russia, but humorously remarked "At least I didn't get up and slap anybody, which is good".

In the United States, Democratic representatives Ayanna Pressley and Jamaal Bowman tweeted in support of Smith, both of which were later deleted. Pressley, who also has alopecia areata, tweeted: "Shout out to all the husbands who defend their wives living with alopecia". Bowman's tweet read, "Teachable Moment: Don't joke about a Black Woman's hair." Several Republican Party representatives, including Marjorie Taylor Greene, also voiced support for Smith's actions, and Representative Andy Biggs used the incident to create anti-Biden memes.

Accusations of staging 
Some commentators felt the altercation was a publicity stunt, due in part to waning viewership numbers for recent years. David Griner from Adweek tweeted: "A slow walk up, an open hand slap, no stagger, slow walk back with no scuffle and no security personnel stepping in? Feels absolutely staged for publicity", and several others agreed. Academy sources later reported that the incident was not planned and that Rock's joke was ad-libbed.

Rumors of the slap being staged were fueled online by a version of the image that was "digitally manipulated to create the illusion that Rock was wearing a cheek pad", but this was debunked.

Alopecia awareness 
Research revealed that Google searches for alopecia increased by 600 percent as people educated themselves on the condition, while Twitter engagement increased by over five million percent, showing that the incident prompted an influx in awareness and learning about alopecia.

U.S. Representative Ayanna Pressley, who has been diagnosed with alopecia, said that the condition is "not a line in a joke". Pressley also tweeted in defense of Smith, saying "Shout out to all the husbands who defend their wives living with alopecia in the face of daily ignorance & insults." and added "Women with baldies are for real men only…boys need not apply." The tweet was later deleted.

In contrast, Bill Maher commented "Alopecia is not leukemia. We all struggle with our hair." Ricky Gervais held similar opinions, remarking sarcastically: "I'm fat and balding. I should get fucking benefits".

Views on criminality 
The LAPD reported that Rock did not wish to file a police report, and former federal prosecutor Neama Rahmani explained that the idea of "pressing charges" is a legal misconception, and that the choice was ultimately up to the office of Los Angeles City Attorney Mike Feuer. Criminal defense lawyer Alison Triessl echoed these sentiments, saying: "I would [be] surprised if the city attorney does not seriously consider [charges] because it was so public... Are they sending the wrong message if they don't prosecute him? [...] It sends a message that you can commit a crime and you won't be punished. This was a very wrong message." However, former Los Angeles County prosecutor Alan Jackson believed that charges would not be pursued so long as Rock did not participate.

The morning after the incident, chief legal analyst Aron Solomon of Esquire Digital, wrote: "It is clear that what happened at the Oscars was an assault under the California statutory definition." Tarek Fatah wrote in The Toronto Sun, "Of the two men in the discussion, only one of them broke the law at the Oscars and got away with it because the LAPD stood back and let it happen... Only when Will Smith is charged with assault and battery will it show that justice is blind". Jody Armour, a law professor at the University of Southern California, argued: "If Smith is not charged, it could imperil the justice system's credibility".

However, other legal experts argued against charges. Alan Jackson said, "To be arrested on a misdemeanor, it has to happen in front of the authorities, or conversely the person against whom the crime was allegedly committed has to file a formal complaint with police". Loyola Law School professor and former federal prosecutor Laurie Levenson said that the case was not serious enough to merit being treated as a priority; defense attorney and former prosecutor Michael Cardoza agreed, saying that though Smith's actions did constitute a crime, "it's not significant enough to clog our courts". Defense attorney Lou Shapiro argued that Smith was not being given any special treatment by not being arrested, stating: "On a simple battery with no injury, LAPD is not deviating from the norm on this one. Unless it's a domestic violence case, they're more likely not going to use resources on it, because if the victim is not going to pursue charges, then who are we protecting at this point?" Experts consulted by the Associated Press agreed that Smith would be unlikely to face charges at all, and, if convicted, would receive only a minor penalty.

Saturday Night Lives Weekend Update discussed the handling of the incident, with Colin Jost quipping: "So now we just ask the victim right after they get hit in the head? 'Hey, are you cool if the guy who just attacked you hangs around for a while? You don't want to make him mad again.'"

Analysis

Toxic masculinity and chivalry 
Monica Hesse, author and columnist for The Washington Post, characterized the act of violence as a misguided attempt at chivalry. Writer Ateh Jewel characterized it as "a chivalrous act loaded with toxic masculinity". Duke University James B. Duke Distinguished Professor of African and African American Studies, Mark Anthony Neal, commented that the incident reflected upon societal values related to perceptions of race and African American masculinity in American media.

Monash University professor at the School of Education Culture and Society, Steven Roberts, further commented on the incident and also placed it within the larger context of toxic masculinity. Roberts concluded that the incident was "another timely reminder that we need to invest in and promote forms of masculinity that are premised on democratic gender relations that centre on empathy and care". University of Southern California professor and executive director of the USC Race and Equity Center, Shaun Harper, further elaborated on the incident as an example of toxic masculinity. Harper emphasized, "Will Smith is 53 years old, which confirms that toxic masculinity is not about immaturity. It is not a thing that men naturally grow out of. Some of us embody aspects of it our entire lives. Understanding what it is and how it shows up in our attitudes and behaviors might just save us from inflicting harm on ourselves and others."

Violence 
Harvard Medical School psychologist Anna Precht supposed: "In a cooler, calmer moment, [Smith] would acknowledge that a joke is not actually a threat." Booker Prize-winning author Bernardine Evaristo placed the incident within the larger context of African American winners of Academy Awards, and lamented that Will Smith chose violence instead of simply words to express himself. In a collaborative academic analysis of the incident, Monash University professors Steven Zech, Beatriz Gallo Cordoba, Lucas Walsh, and Matteo Bonotti, concluded: "Violence (also a form of incivility) is unacceptable, but civility, and when and how to enact it, is complicated. Sometimes it may be better to be impolite and not smile, if we want to promote change."

Racism in Hollywood 
In a column for Glamour magazine, Jenny Singer contrasted the cases of Smith and French–Polish director Roman Polanski. Polanski has been a fugitive from American justice since 1978, after fleeing the country just hours before he was due to be sentenced for drugging and raping a thirteen-year-old girl. Singer observed that the Academy did not expel Polanski until forty years later—in the wake of the MeToo movement—and the acting fraternity in Hollywood was noticeably supportive of the director until his expulsion, which included a standing ovation at the 2003 ceremony upon winning Best Director for The Pianist (2002); by contrast, Smith's ban from attending the Oscars took only two weeks to be decided. Writing for The Guardian, Tayo Bero also described the treatment of Smith as "inequality in plain sight", and noted that the Academy took no action over the furore at the 1973 ceremony where John Wayne allegedly had to be restrained by six security guards to prevent him from assaulting Sacheen Littlefeather, an activist for Native American civil rights.

Financial impact 
Olin Business School at the Washington University in St. Louis professors Tim Solberg and Glenn MacDonald agreed that it was unlikely the incident would have significant financial impacts on the earnings power of either Smith or Rock, but could have negative impacts for the Academy of Motion Picture Arts and Sciences organization. Solberg said, "The Academy itself may suffer damage if it does not take action. [...] The two stars have their followings and the audience is segmented. They will probably not have a drop in earnings as a result. In that sense, their brand is not harmed financially." MacDonald agreed, observing, "In entertainment, they often say there is no such thing as bad publicity." Solberg noted there could be a financial impact to Smith if the major film studios took action: "While financially, the stars have their brand and their following, unless a studio boycotts or the public cancels Will Smith—a major box office star making money for the company—due to the public show of violence, he will maintain his financial draw even if his brand is tarnished."

Rock seemed to financially benefit from the incident when his comedy tour sold out.

See also 
 Assault on Bret Hart
 Kanye West–Taylor Swift incident
 List of "-gate" scandals and controversies; the incident has been dubbed "slapgate"

References

Notes

External links
TIME Magazine article about the incident and the debate surrounding it

2022 controversies in the United States
2022 in American cinema
2022 in American television
2022 in Los Angeles
March 2022 events in the United States
African-American history in Los Angeles
African-American-related controversies
Entertainment scandals
Mass media-related controversies in the United States
Internet memes
Film and television memes
Internet memes introduced in 2022
Obscenity controversies in television
Post–civil rights era in African-American history
Television censorship in the United States
Television controversies in the United States
Violence in California
Academy Awards
2022 controversies
Chris Rock
Will Smith